Patrick Kujala (born 15 May 1996 Marbella, Spanish) is a Spanish-born Finnish professional racing driver, who lives in city of Mäntsälä, Finland and races under a Finnish racing licence. His favorite circuit is Belgium SPA-Francorchamps. Patrik Kujala hobbies tennis, sports and basketball.

Career

Karting 2005-2009 
Flying Finn Patrick Kujala started his career at the age of four (4) as he drove his first laps behind the steering wheel of a karting car.

After impressive lap times his journey in motorsport started in various Spanish karting series which he competed in seasons 2005–2009.

At the age of nine (9) he won the Andalucian Karting Championship series in Alevin category and age of ten (10) he won the title in Cadet category.

In season 2007 Kujala collect 9th position in Cadet class of Spanish Karting series and in season 2009 he finished 6th fastest in KF3-class. Carlos Sainz Jr. also competed in the series and after colorful events he secured the silver medal.

Formula Renault Eurocup & Alps 2011-2012 

In season 2011 he made his debyt in single-seater and joined the French F4 Championship series. After colorful events he had fierce competition with for example Formula-1 driver Pierre Gasly and finished the series in 5th position in overall classifications. He encountered his season highlight in Belgium SPA-Francorchamps as he won the race.

In season 2012 Patrick Kujala entered to Formula Renault Eurocup 2.0 and Formula Renault 2.0 Alps racing series with the Koiranen Motorsport team. After 14 rounds of Formula Renault 2.0 Eurocup he finished in 23th position and in Formula Renault 2.0 Alps series he collect 6th position which also secured the title of Juniors' championship. Formula Renault 2.0 Alps series was won by Russian Formula 1 driver Daniil Kvyat.

7th fastest was Formula 1 driver Esteban Ocon.

GP3 Series 2013-2014 
In season 2013 Patrick Kujala continued collaboration with Koiranen GP in GP3 Series.

It was a difficult season with Dallara GP3/13 car as he was able to collect only five points which delivered him 20th position in overall standings.

In season 2014 Kujala continued competing in GP3-series and entered the series as Marussia Manor Racing driver. He got a good start for the season as he collect 5th position in qualifying and 4th highest points from the race. However, in the middle of the season Kujala was forced to change team as Marussia Manor Racing suffered a bankrupt.

Therefore, he finished the season with Trident and collect 22 points in 18 events which provided him 14th position in overall classifications.

Lamborghini Squadra Corse 2015-2016 
In season 2015 Patrick Kujala changed single-seater cars to GT-cars and entered highly appreciated and very competitive Lamborghini Super Trofeo European Championship series as PRO-driver. Kujala competed the series with Italian Bonaldi Motorsport Lamborghini Huracán Super Trofeo LP620-2 car. In 12 rounds he collect 144 points and made Finnish Racing history by winning the series as first Finn ever.

He won the series with 53 points gap to silver medalist team Daniel Zampieri and Russian Roman Mavlanov.

In season 2016 Kujala continued his successful career in Lamborghini Super Trofeo Europe Championship series with Swiss driver Adrian Amstutz. In 12 rounds of the series Kujala and Amstutz collect 129 points and won the PRO-AM title by five points before Dutch driver Rik Breukers. Furthermore, during the season Kujala competed in selected four rounds of Lamborghini Super Trofeo North America series and 12 rounds in German ADAC GT Masters series with Lamborghini Huracan GT3 which was run by Bonaldi Motorsport.

GT3-cars 2017-2021 
In season 2017 Patrick Kujala entered Blancpain GT Endurance racing series with Swiss driver Adrian Amstutz. In five events they collect 87 points as British Barwell Motorsport driver. Even the season was successful, they still had to satisfy for silver position as British Jonny Adam and his Omani teammate Ahmad Al Harthy collect the victory.

Furthermore, in season 2017 Kujala won bronze medal in Lamborghini Super Trofeo World finals with American Richard Antinucci. Kujala also competed in one Intercontinental GT Challenge event and in two British GT events with British Barwell Motorsport Lamborghini Huracan GT3 car.

In season 2018 Patrick Kujala won the most appreciated GT3 24 hours event in the World which is driven in Belgium SPA-Francorchamps.  Kujala made superb job with his teammates Richard Abra, Adrian Amstutz and Leonid Matchinski and won the event with British Barwell Motorsport Lamborghini Huracan GT3 car. Furthermore, during the season he competed one event in Blancpain GT Endurance Cup, eight rounds in Lamborghini Super Trofeo European Championship series and one British GT event.

In season 2019 Patrick Kujala headed to Italian Porsche Carrera Cup. In 14 rounds he made again superb job and collect silver medal with Bonaldi Motorsport Porsche 911 GT3 Cup II car. He lost silver medal by just one point and Championship title by seven points. Furthermore, in season 2019 he competed in one Intercontinental GT Challenge event, one Blancpain GT Series Endurance Cup event and two International GT Open events. He also raced in various 24 hours endurance races.

In season 2020 Patrick Kujala made, once again, Finnish Motorsport history as first he won the GT World Challenge European Endurance racing Championship Silver Cup series and a moment later he secured silver position in British GT Racing series. He's now the only one who has won a medal in British GT series. In GT World Challenge European Endurance series he collect the title with British Barwell Motorsport Lamborghini Huracán GT3 Evo car with his teammates, British Alex MacDowall and Danish Frederik Schandorff. 

In four events they collect 31 points more than silver medalist Sergei Afanasiev and his German teammate Hubert Haupt. Furthermore, he and his British teammate Sam de Haan lost the British GT title by 19,5 points to Robert Collard and his British teammate Sandy Mitchell.

Furthermore, in season 2020 Kujala competed one event in Intercontinental GT Challenge and two events in British GT series as well as few individual 24 hours endurance GT-races.

Season 2021 got underway in perfect way as he, once again, made Finnish Racing history by winning the Asian Le Mans series AM-group with his German teammates Christian Hook and Manuel Lauck. With Italian Rinaldi Racing Ferrari 488 GT3 car Kujala won the Championship by one point before BMW M6 GT3 car drivers Sami-Matti Trogen and his teammates Jörg Breuer and Henry Walkenhorst. Furtheremore in August 2021 Kujala was victorious in TotalEnergies 24h SPA-Francorchamps as he won the Silver Cup with his MadPanda Motorsport teammates, Argentine Ezequiel Perez Companc, Mexican Ricardo Sanchez and Dutch Rik Breukers.

Season 2022: IMSA Prototype Challenge and Lamborghini Super Trofeo North America racing series 
In season 2022 Patrick Kujala competes in IMSA Prototype Challenge with American teammate Brian Thienes. In first round of the series, which was driven in January, they were second fastest with their Ligier LMP3 car. Furthermore, Kujala competes in Lamborghini Super Trofeo North-America racing series with Italian teammate Eduardo Piscopo as drivers of Californian O'Gara Motorsport which is supported by Arrow Engineering.

Racing record

Career summary

† Guest driver ineligible to score points

Complete GP3 Series results
(key) (Races in bold indicate pole position) (Races in italics indicate fastest lap)

† Driver did not finish the race, but was classified as he completed over 90% of the race distance.

Complete Squadra Corse Lamborghini results

References

External links
 
 

1996 births
Living people
People from Marbella
Sportspeople from the Province of Málaga
Finnish racing drivers
French F4 Championship drivers
Formula Renault Eurocup drivers
Formula Renault 2.0 Alps drivers
Finnish GP3 Series drivers
ADAC GT Masters drivers
24H Series drivers
British GT Championship drivers
Manor Motorsport drivers
Blancpain Endurance Series drivers
International GT Open drivers
Asian Le Mans Series drivers
European Le Mans Series drivers
Auto Sport Academy drivers
Trident Racing drivers
US RaceTronics drivers
Koiranen GP drivers
Lamborghini Squadra Corse drivers
Lamborghini Super Trofeo drivers